The "Kill the Winner" hypothesis (KtW) is an ecological model of population growth involving prokaryotes, viruses and protozoans that links trophic interactions to biogeochemistry. The model is related to the Lotka–Volterra equations. It assumes prokaryotes adopt one of two strategies when competing for limited resources: priority is either given to population growth ("winners") or survival against attacks ("defenders"). As "winners" become more abundant and active, their contact with host-specific viruses (also known as phages) increases, making them more susceptible to viral infection. Thus, viruses moderate the population size of "winners" and allow multiple species (both "winners" and "defenders") to coexist. Current understanding on KtW stems from our knowledge of lytic viruses and their host populations.

The competition specialist, or “winner”, is often described as having the most biomass, but this is somewhat of a misunderstanding. More appropriately, the "winner" is the fastest growing. Their abundance and activity increases when the population competes for a shared limiting resource (e.g. phosphate) and wins. The resource can exist as a free form or as something that needs to be sequestered from biomass. Competition specialists (predators, grazers, parasites) are expected to dominate in oligotrophic environments where competition is a large ecological constraint. When competition specialists are found at uncharacteristically low abundances in oligotrophic environments, the principles of KtW may apply. 

Defense specialists tend to invest resources in avoidance strategies that may result in reduced growth and population reproduction; hence, the “loser” does not increase viral predation. Defense specialists are expected to dominate in eutrophic environments where competition is reduced.
While the KtW model is widely applicable to different trophic levels and complex microbial systems, it has many limitations. The KtW model represents an idealized microbial food web with mathematical parameters that only account for viral predation studied in vitro. Because it assumes environmental conditions are stable, it can only predict population dynamics over a small time frame relative to a microbial community's history. It also fails to account for the fact that a prokaryotic species can be attacked by multiple viruses at once. KtW is expected to be modified, or even replaced, as more methodological limitations regarding its applicability for microbial communities are identified.

History

Paradox of the Plankton 
The Kill-the-Winner hypothesis is related to the paradox of the plankton, which is an observation that many plankton species exist despite having similar resource requirements. This paradox was noted by G.E. Hutchinson in 1961 in relation to phytoplankton, in which many distinct species coexist despite filling the same niche. In a well-mixed pelagic environment, with conditions being roughly constant, prior biological theories, namely the competitive exclusion principle, suggested one species should eventually dominate. Selective predation, varying nutrient requirements, variance in water conditions on microscopic scales, and viral selection were proposed as solutions to the paradox.

Virus-Bacteria Interactions 
Early modelling of viral infections in bacterial populations assumed a predator-prey relationship between viruses and bacteria following the Lotka-Volterra equations, in which both viruses and bacteria can coexist stably in cycles of high and low population. These theoretical models of virus-bacteria interactions were proven to work in E.coli and bacteriophages in laboratory settings. It was also observed that multiple strains of bacteria could coexist if nutrients were limited and phages were introduced to the culture. Growth-oriented, phage-susceptible bacteria could coexist stably with slower growing bacteria that were more resistant to infection. However, real-world marine systems experience grazing pressure, much higher diversity, and more environmental heterogeneity, so these experiments could not perfectly replicate marine conditions.

Kill the Winner 
The Kill the Winner hypothesis was proposed in 1997 during a study of theoretical models for marine bacterial populations. In these models, T. Frede Thingstad and Risto Lignell found that the total size of a bacterial population was controlled by grazing, and lytic viruses had no impact on bacterial abundance in any of the models examined. Instead, viruses were found to promote diversity by preferentially infecting more abundant and active bacteria. It was later found that bacteria with varying growth rates could coexist stably, with faster-growing bacterial species maintaining a higher abundance of viruses. In this way, viruses can prevent the dominance of one species in any particular niche, which maintains microbial diversity and presents a solution to the paradox of the plankton.

Competition and Defense Specialists 
In the context of the KtW model, competition specialists are "winners". Theoretically, these fast-growing competition specialists can use up entire pools of resources if they go uncontrolled. The mechanism behind KtW describes how these populations of competition specialists are controlled by predation from viral phages, granting more slowly-growing defense specialists access to resources. In other words, these viral phages kill the "winner", and it is through this system that competition specialists and defense specialists are able to co-exist through resource limitations.

Rhodobacteraceae are a family of bacteria that possess many of the aforementioned qualities of competition specialists. They are fast-growing and tend to exist at low abundances in oligotrophic environments because they are primary targets of viral phages and grazers. These population dynamics support the principles of KtW through which these organisms act as "winners" and are targeted for it.

Pelagibacterales, or the SAR11 clade, include bacteria that dominate the world's oceans. These organisms are slow-growing. Thus, their ability to maintain such high abundances in the marine environment suggests they are less vulnerable to viral predation. Accordingly, SAR11 is categorized as a defense-specialist.

Respiration Rate and Size 
The differences in metabolic activity between competition and defense specialists can partially be explained by size. Studies of respiration rate among the marine microbe communities of the Gulf of Maine show that Rhodobacteraceae are typically larger than members of the SAR11 clade.

Smaller cells sizes are generally less metabolically active and more slow-growing. The way such size differences contribute to bacterial growth rate have been the subject of numerous debates arguing whether or not the bulk of bacterial communities in marine ecosystems are metabolically active and thus "alive". Arguments that most bacteria in the ocean are "dead" come from observations that few bacteria are nucleoid-containing, meaning most are inactive due to the absence of DNA. Others argue that most bacteria in the ocean are not "dead", but rather sleeping, as cells without nucleoids need not stay that way, and the amounts of DNA these cells possess may simply be hard to trace.

In 2022, contemporary research suggests that staining methods may not be sensitive enough to measure the low respiration rates of the very abundant, but very slow-growing, smaller bacterial cells such as those from the SAR11 clade, giving the impression that only a small fraction of bacteria are "alive". With respect to KtW, the controlled abundance of fast-growing competition specialists by viruses thus has an effect on interpretations of the metabolic activity of bacterial communities at large.

Alternative Hypotheses

Piggyback-the-Winner (PtW) 
Unlike KtW, the Piggyback-the-Winner (PtW) hypothesis makes a key distinction between temperate and lytic viruses and considers viral life cycles. PtW posits that temperate viruses are more abundant than lytic viruses at high host density and growth rate. Hosts may actively recruit temperate viruses, which protect the host from closely related viruses, a phenomenon known as super-infection exclusion. Abundant hosts are parasitized, rather than killed, and high host densities are maintained.

Coevolving KtW Model (CKTW) 
One problematic assumption of the KtW hypothesis is that predator and prey populations are infinite or very large. Given this assumption, the Lotka-Volterra equations would unrealistically imply that neither predators nor prey would go extinct. A 2017 study by Chi Xue and Nigel Goldenfeld tested the effects of the original KtW model on finite populations. Introducing stochasticity resulted in successive extinctions, showing that species coexistence could not be maintained. However, KtW models can be adapted to allow predators and prey to coevolve by mutation. As prey evolve to evade predators and predators evolve to overcome new defenses, new mutants are introduced. Thus, Coevolving KtW (CKTW) models allow species diversity to be maintained, even for finite populations.

See also 
 Coexistence theory
 Community matrix
 Population dynamics
 Janzen–Connell hypothesis
 Paradox of enrichment
 Paradox of the plankton

References

Further reading 

 
 

Population models